John Joseph Nilan (August 1, 1855 – April 13, 1934) was an American prelate of the Roman Catholic Church. He served as Bishop of Hartford from 1910 until his death in 1934.

Biography
John Nilan was born in Newburyport, Massachusetts and received his early education at the elementary and high schools in Newburyport. After graduating from the college of Nicolet at Quebec, Canada, in 1875, he returned to the United States and then studied at St. Joseph Seminary in Troy, New York. He was ordained to the priesthood on December 21, 1878. He engaged in pastoral work in the Archdiocese of Boston, first serving at Framingham and afterwards at St. James Church in Boston. He was pastor of St. Joseph Church in Amesbury from 1892 to 1910.

On February 14, 1910, Nilan was appointed the seventh Bishop of Hartford, Connecticut, by Pope Pius X. He received his episcopal consecration on the following April 28 from Cardinal William Henry O'Connell, with Bishops Louis Sebastian Walsh and Daniel Francis Feehan serving as co-consecrators. He selected as his episcopal motto: "Dominus Firmamentum Meum" (Latin: "The Lord is My Foundation"). One of his first acts as bishop was the establishment of a home for orphan children.

During his tenure, he concerned himself with fostering many ethnic parishes to serve Connecticut's diverse population.

Nilan later died at St. Francis Hospital in Hartford, on April 13, 1934.

References

External links
Roman Catholic Archdiocese of Hartford

1855 births
1934 deaths
20th-century Roman Catholic bishops in the United States
Roman Catholic bishops of Hartford
Religious leaders from Connecticut
American Roman Catholic archbishops